Jogendranagar railway station is located at Jogendranagar in Tripura, India. It is an Indian railway station of the Lumding–Sabroom line in the Northeast Frontier Railway zone of Indian Railways. The station is situated at Jogendranagar in  West Tripura district in the Indian state of Tripura. Total 6 Passengers trains halt in the station.

Details 
The station lies on the 312 km-long  broad-gauge Lumding–Sabroom railway line which comes under the Lumding railway division of the Northeast Frontier Railway zone of Indian Railways. It is a single line without electrification.

Services 
 2 trains per day run between Agartala and Dharmanagar. The trains stop at Jogendranagar station.
 1 train per day runs between Agartala and Silchar. The train stops at Jogendranagar station.

Station layout

Track layout

See also 

 National Highway 8 (India)
 Lumding–Sabroom section
 Northeast Frontier Railway zone

References

External links
 Indian Railways site
 Indian railway fan club

Railway stations in West Tripura district
Railway stations opened in 2008
Lumding railway division